Video Acceleration API (VA-API) is an open source application programming interface that allows applications such as VLC media player or GStreamer to use hardware video acceleration capabilities, usually provided by the graphics processing unit (GPU). It is implemented by the free and open-source library , combined with a hardware-specific driver, usually provided together with the GPU driver.

VA-API video decode/encode interface is platform and window system independent but is primarily targeted at Direct Rendering Infrastructure (DRI) in X Window System on Unix-like operating systems (including Linux, FreeBSD, Solaris), and Android, however it can potentially also be used with direct framebuffer and graphics sub-systems for video output. Accelerated processing includes support for video decoding, video encoding, subpicture blending, and rendering.

The VA-API specification was originally designed by Intel for its GMA (Graphics Media Accelerator) series of GPU hardware with the specific purpose of eventually replacing the XvMC standard as the default Unix multi-platform equivalent of Microsoft Windows DirectX Video Acceleration (DxVA) API, but today the API is no longer limited to Intel-specific hardware or GPUs. Other hardware and manufacturers can freely use this open standard API for hardware accelerated video processing with their own hardware without paying a royalty fee.

Overview 

The main motivation for VA-API is to enable hardware-accelerated video decode at various entry-points (VLD, IDCT, motion compensation, deblocking) for the prevailing coding standards today (MPEG-2, MPEG-4 ASP/H.263, MPEG-4 AVC/H.264, H.265/HEVC, and VC-1/WMV3). Extending XvMC was considered, but due to its original design for MPEG-2 MotionComp only, it made more sense to design an interface from scratch that can fully expose the video decode capabilities in today's GPUs.

Supported hardware and drivers 
As of 2022, VA-API is natively supported by:
 Intel Quick Sync open-source drivers for Linux
 Mesa open-source drivers for AMD and NVIDIA graphics cards
 AMDGPU-PRO drivers for AMD graphics cards on Linux
 libva-vdpau-driver for cards supported by VDPAU
 Direct3D 12 implementations with the VAOn12 driver

Supported video codecs 
VA-API currently supports these video codecs in the official mainline version, but note that exactly which video codecs are supported depends on the hardware and the driver's capabilities.
 MPEG-2 decode acceleration Main Profile
 VC-1 / WMV3 decode acceleration Advanced Profile
 MPEG-4 Part 2 (H.263) (a.k.a. MPEG-4 SP / MPEG-4 ASP, more commonly known as Xvid) decode acceleration
 H.264 AVC encode acceleration Main Profile
 H.264 AVC decode acceleration High Profile
 H.264 / AVC Hardware Variable Length Decoding (VLD) - CABAC
 H.264 / AVC Hardware Variable Length Decoding (VLD) - CAVLC
 H.264 / AVC Hardware Inverse Transform (IT)
 H.264 / AVC Hardware Motion Compensation (HWMC)
 H.264 / AVC Hardware In-Loop Deblocking (ILDB)
 H.265/HEVC encode acceleration
 H.265/HEVC decode acceleration
 VP9 8-bit encode acceleration
 VP9 8-bit and 10-bit decode acceleration
 AV1 8-bit and 10-bit decode acceleration

Processes that can be accelerated with VA-API 
Video decoding and post-processing processes that can be offloaded and accelerated if both the device drivers and GPU hardware supports them:
 Motion compensation
 Inverse discrete cosine transform
 In-loop deblocking filter
 Intra-frame prediction
 variable-length decoding, more commonly known as slice-level acceleration
 Bitstream processing (Context-adaptive variable-length coding/Context-adaptive binary arithmetic coding)

Software architecture 

The current interface is window system independent, so that it can potentially be used with graphics sub-systems other than the DRI (Direct Rendering Infrastructure) in X Window System, such as direct with framebuffer, and it can work with third-party DRM (Direct Rendering Manager) libraries. In a nutshell, it is a scheme to pass various types of data buffers from the application to the GPU for decoding or encoding a compressed bit-stream.

Software supporting VA-API 

 Clutter toolkit
 Jellyfin media server
 datarhei Restreamer real-time live video streaming
 Emby media server (starting from release 3.0.6400)
 Helix media player (Linux)
 ffmpeg, a command line tool from the FFmpeg project, supports VA-API encoding through CLI with version starting from 3.1 and also libavcodec (also part of the FFmpeg project) does contain code that other applications use to support hardware accelerated decoding, including VA-API.
 Fluendo
 Gnash Flash / SWF player
 GStreamer through 

 Kodi (formerly XBMC Media Center) (Linux)
 Kodibuntu (formerly XBMC Live) (Linux Live CD/USB operating-system)
 MPlayer (v1 with patches) and its fork mpv (native)
 MythTV (starting from release 0.25)
 OpenShot
 VLC media player (starting from release 1.1.0)
 Bluecherry DVR client (starting from release 2.2.6)
  Xine (via "xine-lib-vaapi" library) since Version 1.2.3
 OBS Studio
 Firefox (On Wayland since release 78 and on X11 since release 80)

See also 

 Distributed Codec Engine (libdce) — Texas Instruments API for the video codec engine in OMAP based embedded systems
 OpenMAX — a royalty-free cross-platform media abstraction API from the Khronos Group

References

External links 

 Intel Media and Audio for Linux
 mobile-hw-decode
 "VA API slowly -- but surely -- making progress" – an overview from 2009
 "MPlayer, FFmpeg Gain VA-API Support" – from 2008

Application layer protocols
Application programming interfaces
Freedesktop.org
Video acceleration
Video acceleration APIs available on Linux
X Window extensions